Kluge is a German surname.

Kluge also may refer to:
 An improvised engineering patch, also spelled kludge
 Kluge, a German piano-keyboard maker, acquired by Steinway & Sons in 1998
 Kluge (book), a 2008 non-fiction book by Gary Marcus
 Die Kluge, an opera by Carl Orff